Noah Casey Martin (born April 7, 1999) is an American professional baseball shortstop in the Philadelphia Phillies organization. Martin was selected by the Phillies in the third round (87th overall pick) of the 2020 Major League Baseball draft after playing college baseball at Arkansas.

Amateur career
Martin grew up in Lonoke, Arkansas and attended Lonoke High School, where he played football and baseball and ran track. As a junior, Martin batted .508 with 18 extra base hits, 30 runs batted in (RBIs), and 25 runs scored, while also posting a 0.70 earned run average (ERA), with 18 strikeouts, in ten innings pitched. He hit .595 with 66 hits, 13 doubles, six triples, 10 home runs, 32 RBIs, and 34 stolen bases and was named the Arkansas Gatorade Player of the Year, in his senior year.

As a true freshman, Martin hit .345 with 87 hits, 14 doubles, 13 home runs, and 49 RBIs, while playing third base and was named to the SEC All-Freshman team, second team All-SEC, and a freshman All-American by the National Collegiate Baseball Writers Association and the Collegiate Baseball Newspaper. As a sophomore, Martin moved to shortstop and batted .286, with 15 home runs, and 57 RBI, and was named second team All-SEC and was a semifinalist for the Dick Howser Trophy.

Martin entered his junior season on the watch list for the Golden Spikes Award, a preseason first team All-SEC selection, a third team preseason All-American and as a top prospect for the 2020 Major League Baseball draft.

Professional career
Martin was selected in the third round (87th overall) of the 2020 Major League Baseball draft by the Philadelphia Phillies. Martin signed with the team for a $1.3 million bonus.

Martin was assigned to the Low-A Clearwater Threshers to start the 2021 season. He also spent time with the High-A Jersey Shore BlueClaws during the season. Over 98 games between the two teams, he slashed .198/.291/.310 with seven home runs, 42 RBIs, 17 stolen bases and 21 doubles.

References

External links

Arkansas Razorbacks bio

Arkansas Razorbacks baseball players
Baseball players from Arkansas
People from Lonoke, Arkansas
Baseball shortstops
Baseball third basemen
1999 births
Living people
Clearwater Threshers players
Jersey Shore BlueClaws players